In geometry, the truncated triheptagonal tiling is a semiregular tiling of the hyperbolic plane. There are one square, one hexagon, and one tetradecagon (14-sides) on each vertex.  It has Schläfli symbol of

Uniform colorings 
There is only one uniform coloring of a truncated triheptagonal tiling. (Naming the colors by indices around a vertex: 123.)

Symmetry 
Each triangle in this dual tiling, order 3-7 kisrhombille, represent a fundamental domain of the Wythoff construction for the symmetry group [7,3].

Related polyhedra and tilings 
This tiling can be considered a member of a sequence of uniform patterns with vertex figure (4.6.2p) and Coxeter-Dynkin diagram .  For p < 6, the members of the sequence are omnitruncated polyhedra (zonohedrons), shown below as spherical tilings. For p > 6, they are tilings of the hyperbolic plane, starting with the truncated triheptagonal tiling.

From a Wythoff construction there are eight hyperbolic uniform tilings that can be based from the regular heptagonal tiling.

Drawing the tiles colored as red on the original faces, yellow at the original vertices, and blue along the original edges, there are 8 forms.

See also 

 Tilings of regular polygons
 List of uniform planar tilings

References
 John H. Conway, Heidi Burgiel, Chaim Goodman-Strass, The Symmetries of Things 2008,  (Chapter 19, The Hyperbolic Archimedean Tessellations)

External links 

 Hyperbolic and Spherical Tiling Gallery
 KaleidoTile 3: Educational software to create spherical, planar and hyperbolic tilings
 Hyperbolic Planar Tessellations, Don Hatch

Hyperbolic tilings
Isogonal tilings
Semiregular tilings
Truncated tilings